This list contains players who have made 50 appearances or more for the Denmark women's national handball team.
Incomplete

Key

List of players

Sources 

Women's handball in Denmark